Otto Jung (12 July 1930 – 8 May 1998) was an Argentine alpine skier. He competed at the 1948 Winter Olympics and the 1952 Winter Olympics.

References

1930 births
1998 deaths
Argentine male alpine skiers
Olympic alpine skiers of Argentina
Alpine skiers at the 1948 Winter Olympics
Alpine skiers at the 1952 Winter Olympics
Sportspeople from Bariloche